Tom Fitzmorris (born February 6, 1951) is a New Orleans food critic, radio host and author.  Mr. Fitzmorris a Certified Culinary Professional by the IACP.  He began publishing a newsletter, The New Orleans MENU, in 1977.  That newsletter continues to this day at his website, NOmenu.com. He also currently broadcasts daily on 990 AM in New Orleans, the show airs weekdays from 2 pm - 4 pm CDT. "The Food Show" has been broadcast continuously since 1975.

Bibliography

 200 New Orleans restaurants: A selective guide to dining out (1981)
 The ten greatest New Orleans recipes: & a hundred more (1984)
 La Cucina Di Andrea's New Orleans Extra-virgin Recipes (Editor) (1989)
 The New Orleans Eat Book (1991)
 The Eclectic Gourmet Guide to New Orleans (2001)
 Tom Fitzmorris's New Orleans Food: More Than 225 of the City's Best Recipes to Cook at Home (2006); 2018, revised & expanded, edition (with foreword by Emeril Lagasse)
 The Unofficial Guide to New Orleans (w/Eve Zibart & Will Coviello) (2007)
 Tom Fitzmorris's Hungry Town: A Culinary History of New Orleans, the City Where Food Is Almost Everything (2010) 2014 pbk edition

References

External links
 http://www.nomenu.com

American food writers
Writers from New Orleans
Living people
1951 births